Parahya submersa is a species of pseudoscorpion that resides within the monotypic family Parahyidae. It occurs in Singapore and the Caroline Islands.

References
 Joel Hallan's Biology Catalog: Parahyidae

Further reading
  (1991): Notes on the genera Parahya Beier and Stenohya Beier (Pseudoscorpionida: Neobisiidae). Bulletin of the British Arachnological Society 8: 288-292.

Neobisioidea
Pseudoscorpion genera
Fauna of Singapore
Monotypic arthropod genera